Rawya Rashad Said al-Shawa (December 1944 – 3 July 2017) was a Palestinian journalist and politician. She was one of the first group of women elected to the Legislative Council  in 1996.

Biography
Shawa was born in the Shuja'iyya neighbourhood of Gaza City in  December 1944 to a Lebanese mother and Palestinian father. Her father Rashad was mayor of Gaza from 1972 to 1982. She married Aoun Saadi al-Shawa (who succeeded her father as mayor), with whom she had four children. Having graduated with a literature degree from the American University in Cairo in 1964, she worked as a journalist for the al-Nahar al-Maqdasiya and al-Quds newspapers.

In the 1996 elections to the Legislative Council, she ran as an independent candidate in Gaza, and was one of five women elected, becoming the first female Palestinian MPs. She was re-elected in 2006 on the Independent Palestine list.

She died in al-Shifa Hospital in Gaza on 3 July 2017.

References

1944 births
People from Gaza City
The American University in Cairo alumni
Palestinian journalists
Members of the 1996 Palestinian Legislative Council
Members of the 2006 Palestinian Legislative Council
Palestinian women in politics
2017 deaths